Perlmutter (also known as NERSC-9) is a supercomputer delivered to the National Energy Research Scientific Computing Center of the United States Department of Energy as the successor to Cori. It is being built by Cray and is based on their Shasta architecture which utilizes Zen 3 based AMD Epyc CPUs ("Milan") and next-generation Nvidia Tesla GPUs.  Its intended use-cases are nuclear fusion simulations, climate projections and material and biological research. Phase 1, completed 27 May 2022, reached 70.9 PFLOPS of processing power.

It is named in honour of Nobel prize winner Saul Perlmutter.

References 

Cray products
GPGPU supercomputers
Nvidia
United States Department of Energy facilities